Mušicki is a Serbian family name, a demonymic derived from the historical village of Mušić (now Gornji Mušić and Donji Mušić, in Mionica). The ancestors of Lukijan Mušicki had settled in Habsburg territory (Bačka) from Mušić in the Ottoman Valjevo nahija (district). The surname was misspelled in records, the correct form being Mušićki (Мушићки). The old spelling was Emušickij (Емушицкиј), as seen from a 1797 letter of Lukijan Mušicki; he later shortened it to Mušicki. It may refer to:

Kosta Mušicki (1897–1946), Serbian collaborationist commander
Lukijan Mušicki (1777–1837), Serbian poet, prose writer, and polyglot

References

Serbian surnames
Toponymic surnames